Blood diamonds (also called conflict diamonds, brown diamonds, hot diamonds, or red diamonds) are diamonds mined in a war zone and sold to finance an insurgency, an invading army's war efforts, terrorism, or a warlord's activity. The term is used to highlight the negative consequences of the diamond trade in certain areas, or to label an individual diamond as having come from such an area. Diamonds mined during the 20th–21st century civil wars in Angola, Ivory Coast, Sierra Leone, Liberia, Guinea, and Guinea-Bissau have been given the label. The term conflict resource refers to analogous situations involving other natural resources. Blood diamonds can also be smuggled by organized crime syndicates so that they could be sold on the black market.

Financing conflict 
Philippe Le Billon describes the 'conflict resources' argument resting on the suggestion that the most valuable resources, if available to the weaker force in a conflict, can 'motivate' and serve to sustain it. Commodity prices on global markets, however, are not an adequate proxy for the economic value of a natural resource to participants in armed conflict. Critical factors include location, mode of production, and subsequent route to market. Gemstones are exceptionally light and small in relation to their value as observed by Richard Auty who presents the stark contrast – tens of thousands of times the price per kilogram – of diamonds compared to other resources and consequently how 'lootable' they are.

Deep mining for gold, kimberlite diamonds or other minerals requires the operation and maintenance of a capital-intensive facility; alluvial deposits by contrast, can be exploited cheaply using artisan tools for however long the relevant land is secured. Alluvial diamonds are therefore more easily exploited by rebels. These differences between primary and secondary diamonds in resource diffusion and cost of extraction are the basis for Lujana et al.'s rejection of non-resource based claims for Botswana and Sierra Leone's different experience of stability and conflict, since both countries have extensive diamond resources but in different formations.

Despite efforts to frustrate the sale of resources emerging from conflicts, a notable workaround is the agreement of what Michael Ross terms 'booty futures', citing examples mostly from the 1990s concerning diamonds and oil from conflicts in Sierra Leone, Liberia, Angola, Equatorial Guinea, Republic of Congo and Democratic Republic of Congo. In these agreements, worth tens of millions of dollars, both rebels and government parties to conflict negotiate deals to realise value now from the prospect of resource exploitation in the future. This enables the presence of valuable natural resources to finance fighting for either side without being in production or even in the possession and control of said fighters. Natural resources still funding fighters who don't possess them he argues is particularly 'dangerous' because this finance is available to those otherwise losing, or even yet to initiate armed conflict, so can make new conflicts possible or have the effect of lengthening those where defeat may have come sooner.

The different mode of production of kimberlite and alluvial diamonds explains why the presence of the latter in fought over areas fuels conflict in ways the former does not. The need to realise financial value from the resource, means that the availability of 'futures' contracts, and suitability for looting, are key to its influence. Gemstones and rare minerals are much better suited to this activity than heavier or otherwise less portable resources, however valuable those may be in times of peace.

These findings have moved campaigners, policymakers and diplomats to devise regulatory interventions intended to prevent natural resources from funding continued fighting in the hope that this might hasten an end to those conflicts. In the twelve years that followed the end of the Cold War, resolutions imposing sanctions on resource exporters in ten different conflicts were passed at the Security Council of the United Nations.

History

Angola
Reports estimated that as much as 21% of the total diamond production in the 1980s was being sold for illegal and unethical purposes and 19% was specifically conflict in nature. By 1999, the illegal diamond trade was estimated by the World Diamond Council to have been reduced to 4% of the world's diamond production. The World Diamond Council reported that by 2004 this percentage had fallen to approximately 1% and up to today the World Diamond Council refers to this illegal trade to be virtually eliminated, meaning that more than 99% of diamonds being sold have a legal background.

Despite the UN Resolution, UNITA was able to continue to sell or trade some diamonds in order to finance its war effort. The UN set out to find how this remaining illicit trade was being conducted and appointed Canadian ambassador Robert Fowler to investigate. In 2000, he produced the Fowler Report, which named those countries, organizations and individuals involved in the trade.  The report is credited with establishing the link between diamonds and third world conflicts, and led directly to United Nations Security Council Resolution 1295, as well as the Kimberley Process Certification Scheme. Still, after the report was published in 2013 smugglers from these African countries were selling blood diamonds through channels less sophisticated such as social media posts. And rhinestones from Angola, produced by UNITA were being traded to Cameroon to get them a Cameroonian certificate naturalization to then be sold as legitimate.

Ivory Coast
Ivory Coast  began to develop a fledgling diamond mining industry in the early 1990s. A coup overthrew the government in 1999, starting a civil war. The country became a route for exporting diamonds from Liberia and war-torn Sierra Leone. Foreign investment begin to withdraw from Ivory Coast. To curtail the illegal trade, the nation stopped all diamond mining and the UN Security Council banned all exports of diamonds from Ivory Coast in December 2005. This ban lasted about ten years but it was later lifted in April 2014 when members of the UN council voted to suspend the sanction. The Kimberley process officials also notified in November 2013 that Ivory Coast was right producing artisanal diamonds.

Despite UN sanctions, the illicit diamond trade still exists in Ivory Coast. Rough diamonds are exported out of the country to neighboring states and international trading centers through the northern Forces Nouvelles controlled section of the country, a group which is reported to be using these funds of chele to re-arm.

Democratic Republic of Congo
The Democratic Republic of the Congo (formerly Zaire) has suffered numerous looting wars in the 1990s, but has been a member of the Kimberley Process since 2003 and now exports about 8% of the world's diamonds. , there is a warning concerning diamonds proceeding from this area since there have been multiple cases of fake Kimberley certificates accompanying the gems. One of De Beers  most celebrated and priceless diamonds, the D-colour  Millennium Star was discovered in the DRC and sold to De Beers, in open competition with other diamond buyers, between 1991 and 1992.

Liberia
From 1989 to 2003, Liberia was engaged in a civil war. In 2000, the UN accused Liberian president Charles G. Taylor of supporting the Revolutionary United Front (RUF) insurgency in neighboring Sierra Leone with weapons and training in exchange for diamonds. In 2001, the United Nations applied sanctions on the Liberian diamond trade. In August 2003, Taylor stepped down as president and, after being exiled to Nigeria, faced trial in The Hague. On July 21, 2006, he pleaded not guilty to crimes against humanity and war crimes, of which he was found guilty in April 2012.  On May 30, 2012, he began a 50-year sentence in a high security prison in the United Kingdom.

Around the time of the 1998 United States embassy bombings, al-Qaeda allegedly bought gems from Liberia as some of its other financial assets were frozen.

Having regained peace, Liberia is attempting to construct a legitimate diamond mining industry. The UN has lifted sanctions and Liberia is now a member of the Kimberley Process.

In December 2014 however, Liberian diamonds were reported to be partly produced using child labor according to the U.S. Department of Labor's List of Goods Produced by Child Labor or Forced Labor.

Sierra Leone 
The Sierra Leone Civil War started in 1991 and continued until 2002, costing at least 50,000 lives and causing local people to suffer killings, mutilation, rape, torture and abduction, mainly due to the brutal warfare waged by rebel group, the Revolutionary United Front (RUF). The Revolutionary United Front (RUF) claimed that they supported causes of justice and democracy in the beginning, but later on they started to control the villages and to prevent local people from voting for the new government by chopping off their limbs. Victims included children and infants. It created numerous examples of physical and psychological harm across Sierra Leone.

Moreover, they also occupied the diamond mines in order to get access to funding and continued support of their actions. For example, during that time, RUF was mining up to $125 million of diamonds yearly. Since diamonds are used as a funding source, they also created opportunities for tax evasion and financial support of crime. Therefore, United Nations Security Council imposed diamond sanctions in 2000, which were then lifted in 2003. According to National Geographic News, all of these civil wars and conflicts created by rebel groups resulted in over four million deaths in the African population and injuries to over two million civilians. Another latest conflict diamond statistic from Statistic Brain, revealed that Sierra Leone has been listed as second highest in the production of conflict diamonds, which is shown as 1% of the world's production, after Angola, which produced 2.1% in 2016. 15% of Sierra Leone's diamond production are conflict diamonds. It shows that the production of conflict diamonds still exists in Sierra Leone.

According to the 2005 Country Reports on Human Right Practices of Africa from the United States, serious human rights issues still exist in Sierra Leone, even though the 11-year civil conflict had officially ended by 2002. Sierra Leone remains in an unstable political situation, although the country has elected a new government. The huge consequences of blood diamonds still remains a mainstream issue in Sierra Leone. One of the biggest issues is people still being abused by the security forces, including rape and the use of excessive force on detainees, including teenagers. Child abuse and child labor are other serious issues which took place in Sierra Leone after the civil conflicts. As they need a huge number of workers, the security forces started kidnapping and forcing young adults to be their slaves; children were forced to join their army as soldiers, and women were raped. They even burned entire villages. Thousands of men, women, and children are used as slaves to collect diamonds, and they are forced to use their bare hands to dig in mud along river banks instead of digging with tools.

Based on the report, The Truth About Diamonds: Conflict and Development from Global Witness, it mentioned that Sierra Leone is listed as second from the bottom of the United Nation Human Development Index. It also shows that Sierra Leone still makes slow progress, in 2016, in such different aspects as, for example, education, health, and human rights, since 1990, which is also the year that conflicts took place in Sierra Leone. It shows that it is a huge consequence of blood diamonds that it brought into Sierra Leone. Even though the war had ended in 2002 and the government tried to improve and adjust the cooperation of the diamond industry. Sierra Leone resulted in an increase of over US$140 million in 2005 and attempted a percentage return of export tax to diamond mining communities. However, it does not improve anythingthe money is not reaching the public and it has not provided benefit to anyone in the communities. For instance, the Kono district in Sierra Leone has been mined for 70 years, but they still have no basic facilities, like electricity and repairing of roads. Houses are destroyed because of the civil wars. It also examines the unethical issues of how rebel groups treat those locals. They used brainwashing of inexperienced young children and forced them to be child soldiers as they lost their personal freedom and rights under command that included violence and intimidation.

Republic of Congo 
The Republic of the Congo (Congo-Brazzaville) was expelled from the Kimberley Process in 2004 because, despite having no official diamond mining industry, the country was exporting large quantities of diamonds, the origin of which it could not detail. It was also accused of falsifying certificates of origin. The Republic of the Congo was readmitted in 2007.

Zimbabwe
Zimbabwe Diamonds are not considered conflict diamonds by the Kimberley Process Certification Scheme.

In July 2010, the Kimberley Process Certification Scheme agreed that diamonds from the country's disputed Marange Diamond Fields could be sold on the international market, after a report from the Scheme's monitor a month earlier described diamonds mined from the fields as conflict-free.

Conflict diamond campaign
Global Witness was one of the first organizations to pick up on the link between diamonds and conflicts in Africa in its 1998 report entitled "A Rough Trade". With the passing of United Nations Security Council Resolution 1173 in 1998, the United Nations identified the conflict diamond issue as a funding for war. The Fowler Report in 2000 detailed in depth how UNITA was financing its war activities, and in May 2000, led directly to the passing of United Nations Security Council Resolution 1295 and the diamond producing countries of southern Africa meeting in Kimberley, South Africa to plan a method by which the trade in conflict diamonds could be halted, and buyers of diamonds could be assured that their diamonds have not contributed to violence. In this resolution the Security Council wrote:

Welcomes the proposal that a meeting of experts be convened for the purpose of devising a system of controls to facilitate the implementation of the measures contained in Resolution 1173 (1998), including arrangements that would allow for increased transparency and accountability in the control of diamonds from their point of origin to the bourses, emphasizes that it is important that, in devising such controls, every effort be made to avoid inflicting collateral damage on the legitimate diamond trade, and welcomes the intention of the Republic of South Africa to host a relevant conference this year.

Kimberley Process Certification Scheme

On July 19, 2000, the World Diamond Congress at Antwerp adopted a resolution to strengthen the diamond industry's ability to block sales of conflict diamonds. The resolution called for an international certification system on the export and import of diamonds, legislation in all countries to accept only officially sealed packages of diamonds, for countries to impose criminal charges on anyone trafficking in conflict diamonds, and instituted a ban on any individual found trading in conflict diamonds from the diamond bourses of the World Federation of Diamond Bourses. The Kimberley Process was at the start led by South Africa and Canada as vice president and since then every year a new chair and vice chair country are elected to maintain the legitimacy of their practices. This system tracks diamonds from the mine to the market and regulates the policing surrounding the export, manufacture and sale of the products. Also in tourist countries like the United Arab Emirates and the United Kingdom. All the Kimberley member states are not allowed to trade with non members. Before a gemstone is allowed through the airports to other countries, the Kimberley Certification must be presented by the gem's owner or obtained from a renowned attorney. The certificate should also be requested by the customer when the gems have reached a retail store to ensure its provenance.

On January 17–18 of 2001, diamond industry figures convened and formed the new organization, the World Diamond Council. This new body set out to draft a new process, whereby all diamond rough could be certified as coming from a non-conflict source.

The KPCS was given approval by the UN on March 13, 2002, and in November, after two years of negotiation between governments, diamond producers, and Non-Government organizations, the Kimberley Process Certification Scheme was created.

The Kimberley Process attempted to curtail the flow of conflict diamonds, help stabilize fragile countries and support their development. As the Kimberley Process has made life harder for criminals, it has brought large volumes of diamonds onto the legal market that would not otherwise have made it there. This has increased the revenues of poor governments, and helped them to address their countries’ development challenges. For instance, around $125 million worth of diamonds were legally exported from Sierra Leone in 2006, compared to almost none at the end of the 1990s.

Shortcomings and criticism

The Kimberley Process has ultimately failed to stem the flow of blood diamonds, leading key proponents such as Global Witness to abandon the scheme. In addition, there is no guarantee that diamonds with a Kimberley Process Certification are in fact conflict-free.  This is due to the nature of the corrupt government officials in the leading diamond producing countries.  It is common for these officials to be bribed with $50 to $100 a day in exchange for paperwork declaring that blood diamonds are Kimberley Process Certified.

Transparency
The Kimberley system attempted to increase governments' transparency by forcing them to keep records of the diamonds they are exporting and importing and how much they are worth. In theory, this would show governments their finances so that they can be held accountable for how much they are spending for the benefit of the country's population.  However non-compliance by countries such as Venezuela has led to the failure of accountability.

The company Materialytics claims that it can trace the origin of virtually any diamond using Laser-induced breakdown spectroscopy. However, there is no way to know whether a diamond purchased online is blood free or not.

Policy responses

American policy 

On January 18, 2001, President Bill Clinton issued Executive Order 13194 which prohibited the importation of rough diamonds from Sierra Leone into the United States in accordance with the UN resolutions. On May 22, 2001, President George W. Bush issued Executive Order 13213 which banned rough diamond importation from Liberia into the United States. Liberia had been recognized by the United Nations as acting as a pipeline for conflict diamonds from Sierra Leone.

United States enacted the Clean Diamond Trade Act (CDTA) on April 25, 2003, implemented on July 29, 2003, by Executive Order 13312. The CDTA installed the legislation to implement the KPCS in law in the United States. The implementation of this legislation was key to the success of the KPCS, as the United States is the largest consumer of diamonds. The CDTA states: 'As the consumer of a majority of the world's supply of diamonds, the United States has an obligation to help sever the link between diamonds and conflict and press for implementation of an effective solution.

The United States Department of State also maintains an office for a Special Adviser for Conflict Diamonds.  As of October 14, 2015, the position is held by Ashley Orbach.

Canadian policy 
During the 1990s, diamond-rich areas were discovered in Northern Canada. Canada is one of the key players in the diamond industry. Partnership Africa Canada was created in 1986 to help with the crisis in Africa. This organization is also part of the Diamond Development Initiative. The Diamond Development Initiative helps improve and regulate the legal diamond industry.

The Kimberley Process was initiated in May 2000 by South Africa with Canada, a major supporter of instituting the scheme. Canada has now passed several laws that help stop the trade of conflict diamonds. The laws deal with the export and import of rough diamonds, and also how they are transferred. In December 2002, the Export and Import of Rough Diamonds Act was passed by the Canadian government. This law acts as a system that helps control the importing, exporting and transporting of rough diamonds through Canada. The Export and Import of Rough Diamonds Act also states that the Kimberley Process is the minimum requirement of certifying rough diamonds and a certificate is also required for all shipments of diamonds. This certificate is called the Canadian Certificate, it gives permission for an officer to seize any shipment of diamonds that does not meet the requirements of the Export and Import of Rough Diamonds Act.

The Government of the Northwest Territories of Canada (GNWT) also has a unique certification program. They offer a Government certificate on all diamonds that are mined, cut, and polished in the Northwest Territories of Canada. Canadian diamonds are tracked from the mine, through the refining process, to the retail jeweler with a unique diamond identification number (DIN) laser inscribed on the diamond's girdle. To obtain this certificate one must cut and polish the diamond in the NWT.

Technology response 
Technical services have emerged that may act as a solution for tracking diamond movement across borders. A service was launched in July 2016 that allows managers to build systems using a blockchain database for tracking high-value or highly regulated items through a supply chain. Everledger is one using such a system to "record the movement of diamonds from mines to jewelry stores" and is one of the inaugural clients of a new blockchain-based tracking service from IBM.

In popular culture

Diamonds from Sierra Leone is a song by American rapper Kanye West about blood diamonds in Sierra Leone.
Conflict diamonds are a central plot point throughout the James Bond film Die Another Day (2002).
The origins of the Kimberley Process were dramatized in Ed Zwick's motion picture Blood Diamond (2006), starring Leonardo DiCaprio and Djimon Hounsou. The film helped to publicize the controversy surrounding conflict diamonds and led to worldwide awareness of the Western African involvement in the diamond trade.
The CSI: Miami episode "Man Down" (2007) involves the trafficking of African blood diamonds.
Season 3 episode 2 of CSI: NY, first started out as a jewelry store robbery soon uncovered a group of criminals desperate to reacquire a blood diamond stolen during the commission of the robbery.
Law & Order episode "Soldier of Fortune" (2001) involves the murder of a diamond broker who has knowledge of a blood diamond connection between Sierra Leone and a Swiss diamond company.
Danish filmmaker Mads Brügger's documentary Ambassadøren (2011, in English: "The Ambassador") addresses the trade in diplomatic passports in order to make money with blood diamonds.
Players compete in Diamond Trust of London to extract diamonds out of Angola before the implementation of the Kimberley Process.
The remix version of Grammy-winning song Diamonds from Sierra Leone performed by American artist Kanye West, has verses that detail the blood diamond trade in Sierra Leone, and comments about the Western public unawareness of the origins of the diamonds linked to the conflict.
Blood Diamonds is a thriller fiction book title by Jon Land, copyright 2002; 
The Hawaii Five-0 (2010) episode Kalele revolves around the smuggling of conflict diamonds.
The 2009 Tamil movie Ayan shows how an insurgent group in Democratic Republic of the Congo sold blood diamonds to international buyers to buy AK-47 guns in exchange.
The video game Far Cry 2 uses blood diamonds as a currency and it also serves a plot point in the main story.
 In the video games Grand Theft Auto IV, Grand Theft Auto: The Lost and Damned and Grand Theft Auto: The Ballad of Gay Tony, there are a few missions involving blood diamonds being traded on the black market.
 The 2018 film Uncut Gems features blood diamonds being traded on the black market.

See also
 List of diamonds

References

Notes

Literature

External links
The Truth About Blood Diamonds – The international focus on "conflict minerals" is a self-serving charade.; The Wall Street Journal
Diamonds in Conflict – Global Policy Forum
PAWSS Conflict Topics – Conflict Diamonds
DiamondFacts.org – World Diamond Council
AllAsOne.org – Blood diamond trade awareness
Stop Blood Diamonds – Blood diamonds awareness initiative
Stopping Blood Diamonds – The success of the Kimberley Process
Africa's War with Blood Diamonds 
Canadian Mined Diamonds
Diamond Dealers in Deep Trouble as Bank Documents Shine Light on Secret Ways – Documentation about financial flows between HSBC Private Bank and blood diamond dealers (see also Swiss Leaks)
Blood Diamonds – Time magazine
 Editora Oferece "Diamantes de Sangue" em Formato Digital a Todos. Maka Angola, Editora da Tinta da China 

 
Diamond mines
Politics of mining in Africa
Ethically disputed business practices
Aftermath of war
Luxury brands
Mining in Angola
Mining in Liberia
Mining in Sierra Leone
Natural resources in Africa
Politics of Africa
Politics of Angola
Politics of Liberia
Politics of Sierra Leone
Resource extraction
Smuggling
Articles containing video clips
Illegal mining
Funding of terrorism
Organized crime activity